The Baltic operation, also known as the defensive operation in Lithuania and Latvia, encompassed the operations of the Red Army from 22 June to 9 July 1941 conducted over the territories of the occupied Lithuania, Latvia, and Estonia in response to an offensive launched by the German army.

Operational parts
The operation consisted of three distinct smaller operations
Border defensive battles (22–24 June 1941)
Battle of Raseiniai also known as the Kaunas counterattack
Šiauliai counter-offensive operation (24–27 June 1941)
Defense of the Hanko Naval Base (22 June–2 December 1941)

Execution
The principal Red Army formations of the operation were the Northwestern Front and the Baltic Fleet, with the major ground forces consisting of the 8th (commander General Major P.P. Sobennikov), 11th (commander General Lieutenant Morozov) and later 27th Armies.

The operation was conducted after the forces of the Baltic Special Military District were alerted in the morning of 22 June 1941 following a surprise attack by the German Wehrmachts Army Group North which consisted of the 18th, 16th Field Armies and the 4th Panzer Group, and elements of the 3rd Panzer Group, supported by the Luftflotte 1.

On 22 June the same year, the Soviet 8th Army was positioned in northern Lithuania opposed by the German 18th Army. The Soviet 11th Army defended the rest of the Lithuanian border with East Prussia and sought to contain the attacks of the German 16th Army and the 4th Panzer Group.

While the Soviet 8th Army retreated along the Jelgava–Riga–Tartu–Narva–Pskov direction, the Soviet 11th Army sought to initially hold the Kaunas–Vilnius sector of the front, but was forced to retreat along the Daugavpils–Pskov–Novgorod direction. These withdrawals, although costly in losses of personnel and materiel, avoided major encirclements experienced by the Fronts to the south, and succeeded in delaying the Army Group North sufficiently to allow preparation for the defence of Leningrad.

The operation was not a single continuous withdrawal, but was punctuated by short-lived counterattacks, counterstrokes or counteroffensives.

Subordinate Red Army formations
The subordinate formations and units of the Armies were:
8th Army (commanded by Major general Pyotr Sobennikov)
10th Rifle Corps
10th Rifle Division
48th Rifle Division
90th Rifle Division
11th Rifle Corps
11th Rifle Division
125th Rifle Division
12th Mechanised Corps
23rd Tank Division
28th Tank Division
202nd Motorised Division
9th Anti-Tank Artillery Brigade
11th Army (commanded by Lieutenant general )
16th Rifle Corps
5th Rifle Division
33rd Rifle Division
188th Rifle Division
29th Rifle Corps
179th Rifle Division
184th Rifle Division
3rd Mechanised Corps
2nd Tank Division
5th Tank Division
84th Motorised Division
23rd Rifle Division
126th Rifle Division
128th Rifle Division
27th Army (commanded by Major general Nikolai Berzarin)
22nd Rifle Corps
180th Rifle Division
182nd Rifle Division
24th Rifle Corps
181st Rifle Division
183rd Rifle Division
16th Rifle Division
67th Rifle Division
3rd Separate Rifle Brigade

Front subordination
65th Rifle Corps
11th Rifle Division
16th Rifle Division
5th Airborne Corps (2nd, 10th and 201st Airborne Brigades)
Northwestern Front Air Force (commanded by L.P. Ionov)
4th, 6th, 7th, 8th and 57th Mixed Aviation Divisions
10th Anti-Tank Artillery Brigade
10th, 12th and 14th Air Defence Brigades
110th, 402nd and 429th High Power Artillery Regiments
units and subunits of support troops
1st Long Range Bomber Corps of the Reserve of the Supreme High Command (Stavka Reserve)

Aftermath
The Soviet forces were defeated and forced to fall back. The next operation, according to the Soviet official history, was the Leningrad strategic defensive operation (10 July-30 September 1941), which attempted to establish a stable front along the Narva–Novgorod line.

References

Sources
 
 
 
 

Strategic operations of the Red Army in World War II
Naval battles and operations of the European theatre of World War II
Military history of Lithuania during World War II
Operation Barbarossa
Military operations of World War II involving Germany
1941 in Latvia
1941 in Lithuania
1941 in Estonia